Chemmappilly is a place in Thrissur District, Kerala, 23 km from Thrissur. It is in the jurisdiction of Anthikad Police station and the Grama Panchayath is Thanniyam. There is a lower primary school called ALPSchool in the centre. The nearest places are Thriprayar, Nattika, and Peringottukara. This place is on the bank of the river Theevra (Canoli Canal). The postal area is Vadakkummuri-680570. The only Government office is the post office.

In former days at Sreeraman Chira, the sethubandhanam was done by Sambava community. At that time human sacrifice was observed. The last person killed in Sreeraman chira was Chennan. from the name of Chennan this place got the name "Chennan kol" ("kol" means "paddy field"). Finally "Chennan kol" became Chemmappilly.

A hanging bridge was constructed to connect Thannyam and Nattika Grama Panchayaths. It was inaugurated by Shri Adoor Prakash on 31 May 2013. Phoenix Library is working at Chemmappilly. The road to Chemmappily touches Peringottukara and Thriprayar East Nada. Aneswaram Shiva temple and a Mosque are here. During the "Grama pradakshinam" of Thriprayar Thevar at the time of Arattupuzha Devamela, Thevan ran away from Aneswaram Siva, without any sound because Thevar borrowed paddy and coconut from Lord Aneswaram Siva.

See also
 Sethubandhanam at Sreeraman Chira Chemmappilly
 Nalambalam
 Sethubandhanam

Images

References

Cities and towns in Thrissur district